The 2010–11 Top League was the eighth season of Japan's domestic rugby union competition, the Top League. The Sanyo Wild Knights defeated Suntory Sungoliath 28-23 in the final of the Microsoft Cup to claim their first Top League title.

The Top League is a semi-professional competition which is at the top of the national league system in Japan, with promotion and relegation between the next level down.

Changes
 Toyota Industries Shuttles and NTT Communications Shining Arcs were promoted to the Top League, replacing Honda Heat and Kyuden Voltex who were relegated.

Teams

Regular season

Final standings

Fixtures and results

Round 1

Round 2

Round 3

Round 4

Round 5

Round 6

Round 7

Round 8

Round 9

Round 10

Round 11

Round 12

Round 13

Title play-offs 

Top 4 sides of the regular season competed in the Microsoft Cup (2011) knock out tournament to fight for the Top League title. The top 4 teams of 2008–09 were Toshiba Brave Lupus, Sanyo Wild Knights, Toyota Verblitz and Suntory Sungoliath.

Semi-finals

Final

Wildcard play-offs
The two second round winners qualified for the All-Japan Rugby Football Championship.

First round
The Top League teams ranked 7th and 10th played-off for the right to meet the Top League team ranked 5th in the second round. The Top League teams ranked 8th and 9th played-off for the right to meet the Top League team ranked 6th in the second round. 

So Sanix and Ricoh progressed to the second round.

Second round
The Top League team ranked 5th played-off against the winner of the teams ranked 7th and 10th, and the Top League team ranked 6th played-off against the winner of the teams ranked 8th and 9th. The two winning second round teams advanced to the All-Japan Rugby Football Championship.

So Kobelco and NEC advanced to the All-Japan Rugby Football Championship.

Top League Challenge Series

Honda Heat and NTT DoCoMo Red Hurricanes won promotion to the 2011–12 Top League via the 2010–11 Top League Challenge Series, while Canon Eagles and Kyuden Voltex progressed to the promotion play-offs.

Promotion and relegation play-offs
Two promotion/relegation matches (Irekaesen) were played. The Top League teams ranked 12th and 11th played-off against the Challenge 1 teams ranked 3rd and 4th respectively, for the right to be included in the Top League for the following season.

So NTT and Yamaha remained in the Top League for the following season.

Top Ten Points Scorers

End-of-season awards

References

External links
 2010–11 draw and Match Attendance
 Team Profiles (Japanese)
 Top League official site (Japanese)
 Top League video digest
 Table (Japanese)

Japan Rugby League One
2010–11 in Japanese rugby union
Japan top

ja:ジャパンラグビートップリーグ2009-2010